Familia: Orchidaceae
 Subfamilia: Epidendroideae
 Tribus: Epidendreae
 Subtribus: Pleurothallidinae
 Genus: Stelis (Orchidaceae)
 Authority: Lindl. (1842)

Alphabetical list 
, Plants of the World Online accepted the following species:

A

Stelis abdita Luer
Stelis aberrans Luer & R.Vásquez
Stelis acaroi Luer & Hirtz
Stelis aciculifolia Luer & R.Vásquez
Stelis aclyda Luer & Hirtz
Stelis acostaei Schltr.
Stelis acrisepala Luer & Hirtz
Stelis acuifera Lindl.
Stelis acuminata Luer & Hirtz
Stelis acuminosa Luer & R.Escobar
Stelis acutilabia Luer & Hirtz
Stelis acutula Luer & Hirtz
Stelis adelphae Luer & R.Vásquez
Stelis adinfinatum Luer & R.Escobar
Stelis adinostachya Luer & Hirtz
Stelis adrianae Luer
Stelis aemula Schltr.
Stelis aenigma Karremans & M.Díaz
Stelis aeolica Solano & Soto Arenas
Stelis aequoris Luer & Hirtz
Stelis aernbyae Luer & Dalström
Stelis affinis C.Schweinf.
Stelis agatha Luer & Hirtz
Stelis aggregata Luer & R.Escobar
Stelis aglochis Luer
Stelis agonzalezii Luer & Hirtz
Stelis aguirreae Luer & Sijm
Stelis alajuelensis Pridgeon & M.W.Chase
Stelis alba Kunth
Stelis alboviolacea Luer
Stelis aleanophila Luer
Stelis alfredii Schltr.
Stelis aligera (Luer & R.Vásquez) Pridgeon & M.W.Chase
Stelis allenii L.O.Williams
Stelis alleyoop Luer & R.Escobar
Stelis alloinfundibulosa J.M.H.Shaw
Stelis aloisii (Schltr.) Pridgeon & M.W.Chase
Stelis alta Pridgeon & M.W.Chase
Stelis alternans Luer & Hirtz
Stelis amabilis Luer & Hirtz
Stelis amaliae (Luer & R.Escobar) Pridgeon & M.W.Chase
Stelis amaliana Luer
Stelis ambrosia Luer & R.Escobar
Stelis amethystina Luer & R.Vásquez
Stelis amilotensis Luer & R.Escobar
Stelis amoena Pridgeon & M.W.Chase
Stelis amparoana Schltr.
Stelis amphigena O.Duque
Stelis anagraciae Archila & Szlach.
Stelis anchorilabia O.Duque
Stelis ancistra (Luer & Hirtz) Pridgeon & M.W.Chase
Stelis anderssonii Luer & Endara
Stelis andreettae Luer & Hirtz
Stelis andrei Luer
Stelis angustifolia Kunth
Stelis anisopetala O.Duque
Stelis ann-jesupiae Luer
Stelis annedamoniae Solano
Stelis anolis Luer
Stelis antennata Garay
Stelis anthracina Luer & Hirtz
Stelis antillensis Pridgeon & M.W.Chase
Stelis antioquiensis Schltr.
Stelis aperta Garay
Stelis aphidifera Luer & Dalström
Stelis apiculifera Luer & Hirtz
Stelis applanata Luer & Hirtz
Stelis apposita (Luer) Pridgeon & M.W.Chase
Stelis aprica Lindl.
Stelis aquinoana Schltr.
Stelis arbuscula Luer & R.Escobar
Stelis argentata Lindl.
Stelis ariasii (Luer & Hirtz) Karremans
Stelis arrecta Luer & R.Escobar
Stelis ascendens Lindl.
Stelis aspera (Ruiz & Pav.) Pers.
Stelis aspergilliformis Luer & Hirtz
Stelis asperilinguis (Rchb.f. & Warsz.) Karremans
Stelis asperrima (Luer) Pridgeon & M.W.Chase
Stelis asplundii Luer & Endara
Stelis atomacea Luer & R.Escobar
Stelis atra Lindl.
Stelis atrocaerulea Luer
Stelis atroculata Luer & Hirtz
Stelis atrorubens L.O.Williams
Stelis atroviolacea Rchb.f.
Stelis attenuata Lindl.
Stelis atwoodii (Luer) Pridgeon & M.W.Chase
Stelis aurantiaca Luer & R.Vásquez
Stelis aurea (Lindl.) Karremans
Stelis auriculata O.Duque
Stelis aviceps Lindl.
Stelis avirostris (Luer & Hirtz) Pridgeon & M.W.Chase
Stelis azuayensis Luer

B

Stelis bacriosa Luer & R.Vásquez
Stelis ballatrix Luer & R.Vásquez
Stelis barbae Schltr.
Stelis barbellata Luer & Hirtz
Stelis barbimentosa Luer & Endara
Stelis barbuda O.Duque
Stelis batillacea (Luer) Pridgeon & M.W.Chase
Stelis baudoensis Luer & R.Escobar
Stelis beckii Luer & R.Vásquez
Stelis beniensis Luer
Stelis benzingii Luer & Hirtz
Stelis bermejoensis Luer & Hirtz
Stelis bevilacquana (Carnevali & I.Ramírez) Karremans
Stelis bialaria Luer & R.Escobar
Stelis bicallosa Schltr.
Stelis bicarinata Luer & Hirtz
Stelis bicolor Luer & Hirtz
Stelis bicornis Lindl.
Stelis bifalcis (Schltr.) Pridgeon & M.W.Chase
Stelis bigibba Schltr.
Stelis binotii De Wild.
Stelis biserrula Lindl.
Stelis bivalvis Luer
Stelis blandita Luer & R.Escobar
Stelis bogotensis Schltr.
Stelis bolivarensis Luer & Hirtz
Stelis bovilinguis Luer & Hirtz
Stelis boyacensis Luer & R.Escobar
Stelis braccata Rchb.f. & Warsz.
Stelis brachiata Luer
Stelis brachyrachis Luer & Hirtz
Stelis brachystachya Luer & R.Vásquez
Stelis bracteata Schltr.
Stelis bracteolenta Luer & R.Escobar
Stelis bracteosa (C.Schweinf.) Pridgeon & M.W.Chase
Stelis bractescens Garay
Stelis bradei Schltr.
Stelis brenesii Schltr.
Stelis brenneri (Luer) Karremans
Stelis brevilabris Lindl.
Stelis brevis Schltr.
Stelis brevissimicaudata Luer & Hirtz
Stelis bricenorum G.A.Romero & Luer
Stelis brittoniana Rolfe
Stelis brunnea (Dressler) Pridgeon & M.W.Chase
Stelis bucaramangae (Luer & R.Escobar) Pridgeon & M.W.Chase
Stelis buccella Luer & Hirtz
Stelis bucculenta Luer & Hirtz
Stelis butcheri Luer
Stelis buxiflora Luer & Hirtz

C

Stelis caesariata Luer & Hirtz
Stelis caespitosa Lindl.
Stelis caespitula Luer & R.Escobar
Stelis cairoensis Luer
Stelis cajanumae Luer & Hirtz
Stelis calantha Luer & Hirtz
Stelis calceolaris Garay
Stelis calculosa Luer & R.Escobar
Stelis caldaria Luer & R.Vásquez
Stelis caldodsonii Luer & R.Escobar
Stelis caliensis Luer
Stelis calolemma Luer & Hirtz
Stelis calopsix Luer & R.Escobar
Stelis calothece Schltr.
Stelis calotricha Schltr.
Stelis calyptrata Luer & Hirtz
Stelis campanulifera Lindl.
Stelis canae (Ames) Pridgeon & M.W.Chase
Stelis candida (Luer & Hirtz) Karremans
Stelis capijumensis Luer & Toscano
Stelis capillaris Lindl.
Stelis capitata Luer & Hirtz
Stelis capsula Luer & Hirtz
Stelis carcharodonta Carnevali & G.A.Romero
Stelis carchica Luer & Hirtz
Stelis cardenasii Luer & R.Vásquez
Stelis carnalis Luer & R.Escobar
Stelis carnosiflora Ames & C.Schweinf.
Stelis carnosilabia (A.H.Heller & A.D.Hawkes) Pridgeon & M.W.Chase
Stelis carnosipetala Luer & R.Vásquez
Stelis carnosula Cogn.
Stelis caroliae Luer
Stelis carpinterae (Schltr.) Pridgeon & M.W.Chase
Stelis carta Luer & Hirtz
Stelis cassidis (Lindl.) Pridgeon & M.W.Chase
Stelis catenata Karremans
Stelis cauda-equina Luer & R.Vásquez
Stelis caudex Luer & R.Escobar
Stelis cauliflora (Lindl.) Pridgeon & M.W.Chase
Stelis cavatella Luer & R.Vásquez
Stelis caveata O.Duque
Stelis cavernosa Luer & Hirtz
Stelis cavernula Luer & Dalström
Stelis celesticola Luer & Hirtz
Stelis celsa Luer & Hirtz
Stelis chaetostoma Luer & Hirtz
Stelis chalatantha Luer & Hirtz
Stelis chamaestelis (Rchb.f.) Garay & Dunst.
Stelis chasei Luer
Stelis chasmiphora Luer & R.Escobar
Stelis chemophora Luer & Hirtz
Stelis chihobensis Ames
Stelis chiliantha Luer & R.Escobar
Stelis chlorantha Barb.Rodr.
Stelis chlorina (Luer) Pridgeon & M.W.Chase
Stelis chocoensis O.Duque
Stelis choerorhyncha (Luer) Pridgeon & M.W.Chase
Stelis choriantha Dod
Stelis chuspipatensis Luer & R.Vásquez
Stelis ciliaris Lindl.
Stelis ciliatissima Luer & Hirtz
Stelis ciliolata Luer & Dalström
Stelis cingens Luer & Hirtz
Stelis citrinella Luer
Stelis cladophora Luer & R.Escobar
Stelis clausa Luer & R.Vásquez
Stelis cleistogama Schltr.
Stelis cleistogamoides O.Duque
Stelis clematis Luer & R.Escobar
Stelis climacella Luer & R.Escobar
Stelis clipeus O.Duque
Stelis cloesiorum Luer
Stelis clusaris Luer & Hirtz
Stelis cobanensis (Schltr.) Pridgeon & M.W.Chase
Stelis coccidata Luer & R.Vásquez
Stelis coccidifera Luer & R.Escobar
Stelis cochabambae J.M.H.Shaw
Stelis cochabambensis Karremans
Stelis cochlearis Garay
Stelis cochliops Luer & Hirtz
Stelis cocornaensis (Luer & R.Escobar) Pridgeon & M.W.Chase
Stelis coeliaca Luer & Hirtz
Stelis coelochila Luer
Stelis coleata Luer & Hirtz
Stelis collina Schltr.
Stelis colombiana Ames
Stelis colorata O.Duque
Stelis colossus Luer & R.Escobar
Stelis columnaris Lindl.
Stelis comica O.Duque
Stelis comosa Luer & R.Vásquez
Stelis complanata Luer & F.Werner
Stelis compressicaulis Luer, Thoerle & F.Werner
Stelis concava M.R.Miranda, S.G.Furtado & Menini
Stelis conchipetala Luer & R.Escobar
Stelis concinna Lindl.
Stelis condorensis Luer & Hirtz
Stelis conduplicata Luer, Thoerle & F.Werner
Stelis congesta Luer & Hirtz
Stelis conmixta Schltr.
Stelis conochila (Luer) Pridgeon & M.W.Chase
Stelis consors Luer & R.Vásquez
Stelis convallaria (Schltr.) Pridgeon & M.W.Chase
Stelis convoluta (Lindl.) Pridgeon & M.W.Chase
Stelis cooperi Schltr.
Stelis copiosa Luer & Hirtz
Stelis coracina Luer & Hirtz
Stelis corae Foldats
Stelis coralloides Luer & Hirtz
Stelis coriifolia Lindl.
Stelis coripatae (Luer & R.Vásquez) Karremans
Stelis corniculata Luer & Hirtz
Stelis coroicensis Luer & R.Vásquez
Stelis coronaria Luer
Stelis cosangae (Luer & Hirtz) Pridgeon & M.W.Chase
Stelis costaricensis Rchb.f.
Stelis cotyligera Luer & Hirtz
Stelis cracens Luer & Hirtz
Stelis crassilabia Schltr.
Stelis crassisepala Luer & R.Escobar
Stelis craticula Luer & R.Escobar
Stelis crenata (Lindl.) Pridgeon & M.W.Chase
Stelis crenulata O.Duque
Stelis creodantha Luer & Hirtz
Stelis crescentiicola Schltr.
Stelis crinita Luer & Hirtz
Stelis croatii Luer
Stelis crossota Luer & Hirtz
Stelis cruenta O.Duque
Stelis cryophila Luer & Hirtz
Stelis cryptopetala Luer & Hirtz
Stelis crystallina Ames
Stelis cuatrecasasii (Luer) Pridgeon & M.W.Chase
Stelis cubensis Schltr.
Stelis cubicularia Luer & R.Vásquez
Stelis cucullata Ames
Stelis cuculligera Schltr.
Stelis cuencana Schltr.
Stelis culmosa Luer & R.Escobar
Stelis cundinamarcae Schltr.
Stelis cupidinea Luer & R.Escobar
Stelis cupreata Luer & R.Escobar
Stelis curiosa Luer & R.Escobar
Stelis cuspidata Ames
Stelis cutucuensis Luer & Hirtz
Stelis cyathiflora (C.Schweinf.) Pridgeon & M.W.Chase
Stelis cyathiformis Luer & Hirtz
Stelis cyathochila Luer & R.Escobar
Stelis cycloglossa Schltr.
Stelis cylindrata Pridgeon & M.W.Chase
Stelis cylindrica (Luer) Pridgeon & M.W.Chase
Stelis cymbisepala Pridgeon & M.W.Chase
Stelis cypripedioides (Luer) Pridgeon & M.W.Chase

D

Stelis dactyloptera Rchb.f.
Stelis dalessandroi Luer
Stelis dalstroemii Luer
Stelis damianii Karremans
Stelis dapidis Luer & R.Escobar
Stelis dapsilis Pridgeon & M.W.Chase
Stelis darwinii Luer & R.Vásquez
Stelis dasysepala Luer & R.Escobar
Stelis debilis Luer
Stelis decipiens Schltr.
Stelis decipula Luer & R.Escobar
Stelis declivis (Lindl.) Luer
Stelis decurrens Pridgeon & M.W.Chase
Stelis decurva Luer
Stelis dejavu Luer & R.Escobar
Stelis delasotae Luer
Stelis delhierroi Luer & Hirtz
Stelis delicata Luer & Hirtz
Stelis dendrophila Luer & R.Escobar
Stelis depauperata Lindl.
Stelis deregularis Barb.Rodr.
Stelis desantiagoi Solano & Salazar
Stelis desautelsii Luer
Stelis despectans Schltr.
Stelis deuteowerneri J.M.H.Shaw
Stelis deuteroadrianae J.M.H.Shaw
Stelis deuterodewildei J.M.H.Shaw
Stelis dewildei Luer & R.Escobar
Stelis dialissa Rchb.f.
Stelis dies-natalis Karremans & M.Díaz
Stelis diffusa C.Schweinf.
Stelis digitata Luer & Hirtz
Stelis digitifera Luer & R.Escobar
Stelis dilatata (C.Schweinf.) Pridgeon & M.W.Chase
Stelis dimidia (Luer) Karremans
Stelis dimidiata Luer & Hirtz
Stelis diminuta (Luer) Pridgeon & M.W.Chase
Stelis dinoi Luer & R.Vásquez
Stelis diprizo Luer
Stelis dirigens Luer & Hirtz
Stelis discoidea Luer & Dalström
Stelis discolor Rchb.f.
Stelis discophylla Luer & Hirtz
Stelis discors Luer & Hirtz
Stelis discrepans Luer, Thoerle & F.Werner
Stelis dissidens Luer & R.Escobar
Stelis dissimulans Luer & Dodson
Stelis distans Luer & Hirtz
Stelis disticha Poepp. & Endl.
Stelis dithele Luer & R.Escobar
Stelis divaricans Luer & R.Escobar
Stelis divergens Luer & R.Escobar
Stelis diversifolia Luer & Hirtz
Stelis dolabrata Luer
Stelis dolichantha Luer & Hirtz
Stelis dolichopus Schltr.
Stelis domingensis Cogn.
Stelis donaxopetala Luer
Stelis dracontea (Luer) Pridgeon & M.W.Chase
Stelis dressleri Luer
Stelis drewii Luer & Endara
Stelis dromedarina Luer & Hirtz
Stelis duckei E.M.Pessoa & M.Alves
Stelis dunstervilleorum Foldats
Stelis dupliciformis C.Schweinf.
Stelis duquei P.Ortiz
Stelis dusenii Garay
Stelis dussii Cogn.
Stelis dynamica Luer & R.Escobar

E

Stelis ebenea Luer & Hirtz
Stelis ecmeles Luer
Stelis effusa Schltr.
Stelis efsiella Luer
Stelis ejuncida Luer & R.Escobar
Stelis ekmanii Schltr.
Stelis elatior Lindl.
Stelis elatissima Luer & Hirtz
Stelis elegans Luer & R.Vásquez
Stelis elementaria Luer & R.Escobar
Stelis ellipsophylla Luer & R.Escobar
Stelis elongata Kunth
Stelis elongatissima Luer & Hirtz
Stelis emarginata (Lindl.) Soto Arenas & Solano
Stelis embreei Luer & Hirtz
Stelis encephalota Luer & Hirtz
Stelis enervis Luer
Stelis enormis Luer & R.Escobar
Stelis entrichota Luer & Hirtz
Stelis ephippium Luer & R.Escobar
Stelis erecta O.Duque
Stelis erectiflora (Luer) J.M.H.Shaw
Stelis erucosa (Luer & R.Escobar) Pridgeon & M.W.Chase
Stelis escobarii Luer
Stelis esmeraldae Luer & Hirtz
Stelis espinosae Luer & Endara
Stelis eublepharis Rchb.f.
Stelis eudialema Luer & Hirtz
Stelis eugenii Schltr.
Stelis euglossina Luer & R.Escobar
Stelis euprepes Luer & R.Escobar
Stelis euspatha Rchb.f.
Stelis eustylis Luer & Hirtz
Stelis euthema Luer & R.Escobar
Stelis exacta Luer & Hirtz
Stelis exaltata Luer & R.Escobar
Stelis exasperata Luer
Stelis excelsa (Garay) Pridgeon & M.W.Chase
Stelis exigua Luer & Hirtz
Stelis exilis Luer & Hirtz
Stelis expansa (Lindl.) Pridgeon & M.W.Chase
Stelis exquisita Luer

F

Stelis fabulosa Luer & Endara
Stelis falcatiloba (Ames) Bogarín & Serracín
Stelis falcifera Luer & Hirtz
Stelis famelica Luer & R.Escobar
Stelis farinosa Luer & R.Vásquez
Stelis fasciculata Luer
Stelis fascinata Luer & R.Escobar
Stelis fecunda Luer & R.Escobar
Stelis felix Luer & R.Escobar
Stelis fendleri Lindl.
Stelis ferrelliae Pridgeon & M.W.Chase
Stelis filiformis Lindl.
Stelis filomenoi Schltr.
Stelis fissurata Luer & Hirtz
Stelis fissurosa Luer & R.Escobar
Stelis flacca Rchb.f.
Stelis flaccida (Klinge) Pridgeon & M.W.Chase
Stelis flagellaris Luer & Hirtz
Stelis flagellifera Luer & R.Escobar
Stelis flava Luer & Hirtz
Stelis flexa Schltr.
Stelis flexilis Luer & Hirtz
Stelis flexuella Luer & R.Escobar
Stelis flexuosissima Luer & Hirtz
Stelis floresii Luer & Hirtz
Stelis florianii Luer
Stelis floripendens O.Duque
Stelis florulenta Luer
Stelis fluxflorum Luer & R.Escobar
Stelis foetida O.Duque
Stelis fons-stellarum Luer & R.Vásquez
Stelis fonsflorum (Lindl.) Pridgeon & M.W.Chase
Stelis formosa Luer & Hirtz
Stelis fornicata (Luer) Pridgeon & M.W.Chase
Stelis fornix Luer & R.Escobar
Stelis fortis Luer & Dalström
Stelis fortunae (Luer & Dressler) Pridgeon & M.W.Chase
Stelis foveata Lindl.
Stelis fractiflexa Ames & C.Schweinf.
Stelis fragilis Luer
Stelis franciscana O.Duque
Stelis franciscensis Luer & F.Werner
Stelis fredoniensis O.Duque
Stelis freyi Luer & Toscano
Stelis frondifera Luer & R.Escobar
Stelis frontinensis O.Duque
Stelis fuchsii Luer & R.Vásquez
Stelis furculifera (Dressler & Bogarín) Bogarín
Stelis furfuracea F.Lehm. & Kraenzl.
Stelis fusilifera Luer & R.Escobar

G

Stelis galapagosensis Luer & R.Escobar
Stelis galeata (Lindl.) Pridgeon & M.W.Chase
Stelis galeola Luer & Hirtz
Stelis galerasensis (Luer) Pridgeon & M.W.Chase
Stelis gargantua Pridgeon & M.W.Chase
Stelis gastrodes Luer & Hirtz
Stelis gelida (Lindl.) Pridgeon & M.W.Chase
Stelis gemma Garay
Stelis gemmulosa Luer & Hirtz
Stelis gentryi Luer & Dodson
Stelis genychila Garay
Stelis gerontica Luer & R.Escobar
Stelis gibbosa Luer & R.Vásquez
Stelis gigantea Pridgeon & M.W.Chase
Stelis gigantissima Luer
Stelis gigapetala Luer & R.Escobar
Stelis giraffina Luer & R.Escobar
Stelis glaberrima Luer & Hirtz
Stelis glacensis Dod
Stelis glanduligera Luer & Hirtz
Stelis glaucus A.Doucette & J.Portilla
Stelis globiflora Rchb.f.
Stelis globosa Pridgeon & M.W.Chase
Stelis globulifera Luer & Hirtz
Stelis glochochila Luer & R.Escobar
Stelis glomerosa Luer
Stelis glomifera Luer & R.Escobar
Stelis gloriae O.Duque
Stelis glossula Rchb.f.
Stelis glossulicles Luer & Hirtz
Stelis glumacea Lindl.
Stelis gnoma Pridgeon & M.W.Chase
Stelis gongylophora Luer & R.Escobar
Stelis gracilifolia C.Schweinf.
Stelis gracilis Ames
Stelis grandibracteata C.Schweinf.
Stelis grandiflora Lindl.
Stelis gravida Luer & R.Escobar
Stelis greenwoodii Soto Arenas & Solano
Stelis grossilabris Rchb.f.
Stelis guerrerensis Soto Arenas & Solano
Stelis guianensis Rolfe
Stelis gunningiana (Barb.Rodr.) ined.
Stelis gustavoi O.Duque
Stelis guttata (Luer) Pridgeon & M.W.Chase

H

Stelis habrostachya Luer & Hirtz
Stelis hagsateri Solano
Stelis hallii Lindl.
Stelis haltonii Luer
Stelis hamiltoniana J.M.H.Shaw
Stelis hamiltonii (Luer) Pridgeon & M.W.Chase
Stelis hammelii Luer
Stelis hansenacea Luer & R.Escobar
Stelis harlingii (Garay) Pridgeon & M.W.Chase
Stelis hercules Luer & R.Escobar
Stelis herzogii Schltr.
Stelis heteroarcuata J.M.H.Shaw
Stelis heterosepala Schltr.
Stelis hiatilabia Luer & R.Escobar
Stelis hippocrepica Luer & R.Escobar
Stelis hirsuta Garay
Stelis hirtella (Garay) Luer
Stelis hirtzii Luer
Stelis hispida Luer & Hirtz
Stelis hoeijeri Luer & Dalström
Stelis hoppii Schltr.
Stelis hualluapampensis Collantes & Karremans
Stelis huilensis O.Duque
Stelis humboldtina Luer & Hirtz
Stelis humidensis Luer & R.Escobar
Stelis humilis Lindl.
Stelis hutchisonii D.E.Benn. & Christenson
Stelis hyacinthalis Luer & R.Escobar
Stelis hydra (Karremans & C.M.Sm.) Karremans
Stelis hydroidea Luer & Hirtz
Stelis hylophila Rchb.f.
Stelis hymenantha Schltr.
Stelis hymenopetala Luer & Endara
Stelis hypsela Luer
Stelis hypsitera Luer & R.Escobar

I–J

Stelis ibischiorum Luer & R.Vásquez
Stelis imbricans Luer & Hirtz
Stelis immersa (Linden & Rchb.f.) Pridgeon & M.W.Chase
Stelis immodica Luer & Hirtz
Stelis imperalis Luer & R.Escobar
Stelis imperiosa Luer & R.Escobar
Stelis impostor Luer & Hirtz
Stelis imraei (Lindl.) Pridgeon & M.W.Chase
Stelis inamoena Luer & R.Escobar
Stelis inclinata O.Duque
Stelis index Luer & R.Escobar
Stelis inedita Luer & R.Escobar
Stelis inflata Luer
Stelis infundibulosa (Luer) Pridgeon & M.W.Chase
Stelis ingridiana Luer & Hirtz
Stelis inquisiviensis Luer & R.Vásquez
Stelis insectifera Karremans
Stelis intermedia Poepp. & Endl.
Stelis intonsa Luer & Endara
Stelis ionantha Luer & R.Escobar
Stelis ipialesensis Luer & Hirtz
Stelis irrasa Luer & R.Vásquez
Stelis isthmi Schltr.
Stelis itatiayae Schltr.
Stelis iwatsukae T.Hashim.
Stelis jalapensis (Kraenzl.) Pridgeon & M.W.Chase
Stelis jamesonii Lindl.
Stelis janetiae (Luer) Pridgeon & M.W.Chase
Stelis janus Luer & Hirtz
Stelis jatunyacuensis Luer & Hirtz
Stelis jenssenii Urb.
Stelis jesupiorum (Luer & Hirtz) Karremans
Stelis jimburae Luer & Hirtz
Stelis johnsonii Ames
Stelis jorgei Luer
Stelis jubata Luer & R.Vásquez
Stelis juncea Luer & Hirtz
Stelis juninensis Kraenzl.
Stelis jurisdicciensis Luer & R.Escobar
Stelis jurisdixii (Luer & R.Escobar) Pridgeon & M.W.Chase
Stelis juxta (Luer, Thoerle & F.Werner) J.M.H.Shaw

K–L

Stelis kailae Solano & C.Dietz
Stelis kareniae Luer
Stelis kautskyi Luer & Toscano
Stelis kefersteiniana (Rchb.f.) Pridgeon & M.W.Chase
Stelis kentii Luer
Stelis kilimanjaro Luer & R.Vásquez
Stelis kroemeri Luer
Stelis kuijtii Luer & Hirtz
Stelis lacertina Luer & R.Escobar
Stelis laevigata (Lindl.) Pridgeon & M.W.Chase
Stelis laevis (Luer & Hirtz) Pridgeon & M.W.Chase
Stelis lagarantha Luer & R.Escobar
Stelis lagarophyta (Luer) Karremans
Stelis lalinensis Luer & R.Escobar
Stelis lamellata Lindl.
Stelis laminata (Luer) Pridgeon & M.W.Chase
Stelis lanata Lindl.
Stelis lancea Lindl.
Stelis lanceolata (Ruiz & Pav.) Willd.
Stelis lancifera Luer & R.Escobar
Stelis langlassei Schltr.
Stelis lankesteri Ames
Stelis lanuginosa Luer & Dalström
Stelis lapazensis Villegas-Murillo & Karremans
Stelis lapinerae Soto Arenas & Solano
Stelis laplanadensis Luer & R.Escobar
Stelis lappacea Luer & Teague
Stelis larsenii Luer
Stelis lasallei Foldats
Stelis latimarginata Luer & Hirtz
Stelis latipetala Ames
Stelis latisepala C.Schweinf.
Stelis laudabilis Luer & Hirtz
Stelis lauta Karremans
Stelis laxa Schltr.
Stelis lehmanneptis (Luer & R.Escobar) Pridgeon & M.W.Chase
Stelis lehmanniana (Schltr.) Karremans
Stelis lehmannii Pridgeon & M.W.Chase
Stelis lennartii Karremans
Stelis lentiginosa Lindl.
Stelis lepidella Luer & Hirtz
Stelis leprina Luer & R.Escobar
Stelis leptochila Luer & R.Escobar
Stelis leptorhiza Luer & R.Escobar
Stelis leptoschesa Luer & Hirtz
Stelis leucantha Luer
Stelis levicula Luer
Stelis liberalis Luer & J.Portilla
Stelis ligulata (Lindl.) Pridgeon & M.W.Chase
Stelis lijiae Luer & R.Escobar
Stelis lilliputana Luer & F.Werner
Stelis limbata Luer & Hirtz
Stelis lindenii Lindl.
Stelis lindleyana Cogn.
Stelis listerophora (Schltr.) Pridgeon & M.W.Chase
Stelis listrophylla Luer & Hirtz
Stelis litensis Luer & Hirtz
Stelis llipiensis Luer & Hirtz
Stelis loculifera Luer
Stelis loefgrenii Cogn.
Stelis loejtnantii Luer & Endara
Stelis londonnii O.Duque
Stelis longipetala O.Duque
Stelis longipetiolata Ames
Stelis longiracemosa Schltr.
Stelis longirepens Carnevali & J.L.Tapia
Stelis longispicata (L.O.Williams) Pridgeon & M.W.Chase
Stelis longissima Luer & Hirtz
Stelis lopezii Luer
Stelis lorenae Luer
Stelis loxensis Lindl.
Stelis lueri Karremans
Stelis lueriana J.M.H.Shaw
Stelis lugoi Luer & Endara
Stelis luisii Luer
Stelis lumbricosa O.Duque
Stelis lutea Lindl.
Stelis luteola Luer & Hirtz
Stelis luteria Luer & Hirtz
Stelis lynniana Luer

M

Stelis machupicchuensis Collantes & C.Martel
Stelis macilenta Luer & Hirtz
Stelis macra Schltr.
Stelis macrolemma Luer & Endara
Stelis maculata Pridgeon & M.W.Chase
Stelis maderoi Schltr.
Stelis madsenii Luer & Endara
Stelis maduroi Luer & Sijm
Stelis magdalenae (Rchb.f.) Pridgeon & M.W.Chase
Stelis magnesialis Luer & Hirtz
Stelis magnicava Dod
Stelis magnipetala Schltr.
Stelis maguirei (Luer) Karremans
Stelis major Rchb.f.
Stelis majorella Luer & Hirtz
Stelis majuscula Luer
Stelis maloi Luer
Stelis malvina Luer, Thoerle & F.Werner
Stelis mammillata Luer & Hirtz
Stelis mandoniana Schltr.
Stelis mandonii (Rchb.f.) Pridgeon & M.W.Chase
Stelis maniola Luer & Hirtz
Stelis marginata Luer & R.Escobar
Stelis marioi Luer & Hirtz
Stelis martinezii Solano
Stelis matula Luer & Hirtz
Stelis maxima Lindl.
Stelis maxonii Schltr.
Stelis medinae Luer & Hirtz
Stelis mediocarinata (C.Schweinf.) Karremans
Stelis meerenbergensis Luer & R.Escobar
Stelis megachlamys (Schltr.) Pupulin
Stelis megalocephala Luer
Stelis megaloglossa Luer
Stelis megalops Luer & Hirtz
Stelis meganthera Luer
Stelis megapetala Luer
Stelis megistantha Schltr.
Stelis melanopus (F.Lehm. & Kraenzl.) Karremans
Stelis melanostele (Luer & R.Vásquez) Pridgeon & M.W.Chase
Stelis melanoxantha Rchb.f.
Stelis membranacea Luer & Hirtz
Stelis memorialis Luer & Hirtz
Stelis mendietae (Luer, Thoerle & F.Werner) J.M.H.Shaw
Stelis mendozae Luer
Stelis menippe Luer & R.Escobar
Stelis meridana (Rchb.f.) Karremans
Stelis mesohybos Schltr.
Stelis micacea Luer & Hirtz
Stelis micklowii Luer
Stelis micragrostis Schltr.
Stelis micrantha (Sw.) Sw.
Stelis microchila Schltr.
Stelis micropetala Luer & Hirtz
Stelis microstigma Rchb.f.
Stelis microsynema Luer & Hirtz
Stelis microtatantha Schltr.
Stelis microtis Rchb.f.
Stelis milagrensis Luer & Hirtz
Stelis millenaria Luer
Stelis minima Luer & Toscano
Stelis minuscula Luer & R.Vásquez
Stelis minutissima Luer
Stelis mirabilis Schltr.
Stelis miranda Luer & R.Escobar
Stelis mirandae Beutelsp. & Mor.-Mol.
Stelis misera Luer & Hirtz
Stelis mnemonica Luer & Hirtz
Stelis mocoana Schltr.
Stelis modesta Barb.Rodr.
Stelis modica Luer, Thoerle & F.Werner
Stelis molaui Luer & Endara
Stelis molecula Luer & R.Escobar
Stelis molleturensis Luer & Hirtz
Stelis molleturoi (Luer & Dodson) Pridgeon & M.W.Chase
Stelis monetaria Luer & R.Escobar
Stelis monicae Luer & Hirtz
Stelis moniligera Luer & Hirtz
Stelis montana L.O.Williams
Stelis montis-mortensis (Karremans & Bogarín) Bogarín & Karremans
Stelis montserratii (Porsch) Karremans
Stelis morae Luer
Stelis mordica Luer & R.Escobar
Stelis morenoi Luer & R.Vásquez
Stelis morganii Dodson & Garay
Stelis moritzii (Rchb.f.) Pridgeon & M.W.Chase
Stelis morula Luer & R.Escobar
Stelis mucronella Luer
Stelis mucronipetala Schltr.
Stelis mucrouncata Dod
Stelis multiflora Luer & Hirtz
Stelis multirostris (Rchb.f.) Pridgeon & M.W.Chase
Stelis mundula Luer & Hirtz
Stelis muscosa Lindl.
Stelis mystax (Luer) Pridgeon & M.W.Chase
Stelis mystrion Luer & R.Escobar

N

Stelis nagelii Solano
Stelis nambijae Luer & Hirtz
Stelis nana Lindl.
Stelis naniflora Luer & R.Vásquez
Stelis navicularis Garay
Stelis naviculigera Schltr.
Stelis neglecta I.Bock & Speckm.
Stelis nemoralis Luer & R.Escobar
Stelis neowerneri J.M.H.Shaw
Stelis nephropetala Schltr.
Stelis nepotula Luer & Hirtz
Stelis neudeckeri Luer & Dodson
Stelis nexipous Garay
Stelis nexosa Luer & R.Escobar
Stelis niessen-andreae Luer
Stelis niesseniae (Luer) Karremans
Stelis nigrescens Luer & Hirtz
Stelis nigriflora (L.O.Williams) Pridgeon & M.W.Chase
Stelis nikiae Luer & Hirtz
Stelis ninguida Luer & Dalström
Stelis nitens Rchb.f.
Stelis nivalis (Luer) Pridgeon & M.W.Chase
Stelis nonresupinata Solano & Soto Arenas
Stelis norae Foldats
Stelis nostalgia Luer
Stelis nubis Ames
Stelis nutans Lindl.
Stelis nutationis Luer & R.Vásquez
Stelis nycterina Luer & Hirtz

O

Stelis oaxacana Solano
Stelis obescula Luer & R.Escobar
Stelis oblector Luer & R.Escobar
Stelis oblonga (Ruiz & Pav.) Willd.
Stelis oblongifolia Lindl.
Stelis obovata C.Schweinf.
Stelis obscurata Rchb.f.
Stelis obtecta Luer & Dalström
Stelis ocreosa Luer & R.Escobar
Stelis octavioi Luer & R.Escobar
Stelis odobenella Luer
Stelis odontopetala Luer & Hirtz
Stelis oestlundiana (L.O.Williams) Pridgeon & M.W.Chase
Stelis oligantha Barb.Rodr.
Stelis oligoblephara Schltr.
Stelis oligobotrya Luer & R.Vásquez
Stelis onychosepala Luer & R.Vásquez
Stelis opercularis Luer
Stelis ophioceps Luer & Hirtz
Stelis ophiodontodes Luer & R.Escobar
Stelis ophioglossoides (Jacq.) Sw.
Stelis opimipetala Luer & Hirtz
Stelis oreada Luer & Endara
Stelis orecta Luer & Hirtz
Stelis orectopus (Luer) Pridgeon & M.W.Chase
Stelis oreibator Luer & R.Escobar
Stelis ornata (Rchb.f.) Pridgeon & M.W.Chase
Stelis orphana Luer
Stelis ortegae Luer & Hirtz
Stelis oscargrouchii Karremans
Stelis oscarii Luer
Stelis oscitans Luer
Stelis otara Luer & R.Escobar
Stelis ottonis Schltr.
Stelis ovatilabia Schltr.
Stelis oxypetala Schltr.
Stelis oxysepala Schltr.
Stelis ozota Luer & R.Escobar

P–Q

Stelis pachoi Luer & R.Escobar
Stelis pachyglossa (Lindl.) Pridgeon & M.W.Chase
Stelis pachypetala Luer & R.Vásquez
Stelis pachyphyta Luer & Hirtz
Stelis pachypus F.Lehm. & Kraenzl.
Stelis pachyrrhiza Luer & R.Vásquez
Stelis pachystachya Lindl.
Stelis pachythrix Luer & R.Escobar
Stelis pactensis Luer & Hirtz
Stelis palifera Luer & R.Escobar
Stelis palimmeces Luer & R.Escobar
Stelis palmeiraensis Barb.Rodr.
Stelis pan Luer & Hirtz
Stelis panguiensis Luer & Hirtz
Stelis paniculata Luer & Hirtz
Stelis papaquerensis Rchb.f.
Stelis papilio O.Duque
Stelis papiliopsis O.Duque
Stelis papillifera (Rolfe) Pridgeon & M.W.Chase
Stelis papposa Luer & R.Escobar
Stelis papuligera (Schltr.) Karremans
Stelis papulina Luer & Dalström
Stelis paradisicola Luer & Hirtz
Stelis paradoxa Luer & R.Escobar
Stelis paraensis Barb.Rodr.
Stelis paraguasensis Luer
Stelis pardipes Rchb.f.
Stelis parviflora (Ruiz & Pav.) Pers.
Stelis parvifolia Garay
Stelis parvilabris Lindl.
Stelis parvipetala Luer & Hirtz
Stelis parvula Lindl.
Stelis pasminoi Luer
Stelis pastoensis Schltr.
Stelis patateensis (Luer) Pridgeon & M.W.Chase
Stelis patella O.Duque
Stelis patens Karremans
Stelis patinaria Luer & Hirtz
Stelis patzii Luer
Stelis pauciflora Lindl.
Stelis pauloensis Hoehne & Schltr.
Stelis paulula Luer & H.P.Jesup
Stelis pauxilla Luer & R.Escobar
Stelis peculiaris Karremans
Stelis pedanocaulon Luer & Hirtz
Stelis peduncularis Luer & Hirtz
Stelis peliochyla Barb.Rodr.
Stelis pellucida (Luer & Hirtz) Pridgeon & M.W.Chase
Stelis pelycophora Luer & Hirtz
Stelis pendens Luer & R.Vásquez
Stelis pendularis O.Duque
Stelis pendulata O.Duque
Stelis pennelliana (Luer) Pridgeon & M.W.Chase
Stelis perbona Luer & R.Escobar
Stelis peregrina Luer
Stelis perexigua Luer & Hirtz
Stelis perparva C.Schweinf.
Stelis perpusilla Cogn.
Stelis perpusilliflora Cogn.
Stelis pertenuis Luer & R.Escobar
Stelis pertusa I.Jiménez
Stelis peruviana Damian & Karremans
Stelis petiolaris Schltr.
Stelis petiolata Luer & Hirtz
Stelis phaeomelana Schltr.
Stelis phil-jesupii Luer
Stelis philargyrus Rchb.f.
Stelis pholeoglossa Luer & R.Vásquez
Stelis physoglossa Luer & F.Werner
Stelis picea Luer & Hirtz
Stelis pidax (Luer) Karremans
Stelis piestopus Schltr.
Stelis pileata (Karremans & Bogarín) Karremans & Bogarín
Stelis pilicrepa Luer & R.Escobar
Stelis pilifera (Lindl.) Pridgeon & M.W.Chase
Stelis pilipapillosa O.Duque
Stelis pilosa Pridgeon & M.W.Chase
Stelis pilosissima Luer
Stelis pilostoma (Luer) Pridgeon & M.W.Chase
Stelis pilulosa Luer, Thoerle & F.Werner
Stelis pinguis Luer & R.Escobar
Stelis piperina Lindl.
Stelis pisinna Luer & Hirtz
Stelis pittieri (Schltr.) Rojas-Alv. & Karremans
Stelis pixie Luer & Hirtz
Stelis planipetala Ames
Stelis platypetala Luer & Dalström
Stelis platystachya Garay & Dunst.
Stelis platystylis (Schltr.) Solano & Soto Arenas
Stelis pluriracemosa Luer & Hirtz
Stelis poasensis (Ames) Chinchilla & Karremans
Stelis poculifera Luer & Hirtz
Stelis pollerecta Luer & R.Escobar
Stelis pollex Luer & Hirtz
Stelis polyantha Luer & Hirtz
Stelis polybotrya Lindl.
Stelis polycarpica Luer & Hirtz
Stelis pompalis (Ames) Pridgeon & M.W.Chase
Stelis popayanensis F.Lehm. & Kraenzl.
Stelis porpax Rchb.f.
Stelis portillae Luer & Hirtz
Stelis posadarum Luer & R.Escobar
Stelis possoae (Luer) Karremans
Stelis potpourri Luer
Stelis powellii Schltr.
Stelis praealta (Luer & Hirtz) Pridgeon & M.W.Chase
Stelis praecipua Luer
Stelis praemorsa Schltr.
Stelis prava Luer & Hirtz
Stelis preclara Luer & Hirtz
Stelis prionota Luer & R.Escobar
Stelis pristis Luer
Stelis prodigiosa Luer & R.Escobar
Stelis prolata Luer & Hirtz
Stelis prolificans (Luer & Hirtz) Pridgeon & M.W.Chase
Stelis prolificosa Luer & Hirtz
Stelis prolixa (Luer & Hirtz) Pridgeon & M.W.Chase
Stelis propagans Luer & Hirtz
Stelis protracta Luer & Hirtz
Stelis protuberans Luer & Hirtz
Stelis pseudocheila (Luer & R.Escobar) Pridgeon & M.W.Chase
Stelis psilantha (Luer) Pridgeon & M.W.Chase
Stelis pubipetala Luer & Hirtz
Stelis pudens Luer
Stelis pugiunculi Lindl.
Stelis pulchella Kunth
Stelis pulchra Luer & R.Escobar
Stelis punchinello Luer & R.Vásquez
Stelis punctulata (Rchb.f.) Soto Arenas
Stelis punicea Luer & R.Escobar
Stelis punoensis C.Schweinf.
Stelis purdiaei Lindl.
Stelis purpurascens A.Rich. & Galeotti
Stelis purpurea (Ruiz & Pav.) Willd.
Stelis purpurella Luer & Hirtz
Stelis purpurina Luer & R.Vásquez
Stelis pusilla Kunth
Stelis putumayoensis Luer & R.Escobar
Stelis pycnochila Luer & R.Vásquez
Stelis pygmaea Cogn.
Stelis pyramidalis O.Duque
Stelis quadrata Luer & R.Vásquez
Stelis quinquenervia C.Schweinf.
Stelis quintella Luer & Hirtz

R

Stelis rabei Foldats
Stelis radicans Luer & R.Escobar
Stelis ramificans Luer & Endara
Stelis ramonensis Schltr.
Stelis ramosii Luer
Stelis ramulosa Luer & Dalström
Stelis rectangularis Luer & R.Escobar
Stelis regalis (Luer) Karremans
Stelis regia Luer, Thoerle & F.Werner
Stelis regina Luer & Hirtz
Stelis reitzii Garay
Stelis remifolia Luer & Hirtz
Stelis remulifera Luer & R.Escobar
Stelis reniformis Luer & Hirtz
Stelis repens Cogn.
Stelis reptans Pridgeon & M.W.Chase
Stelis reptata Luer & R.Escobar
Stelis resupinata (Ames) Pridgeon & M.W.Chase
Stelis retroversa O.Duque
Stelis retusa (Lex.) Pridgeon & M.W.Chase
Stelis retusiloba (C.Schweinf.) Pridgeon & M.W.Chase
Stelis rhamphosa O.Duque
Stelis rhodochila Schltr.
Stelis rhodotantha (Rchb.f.) Pridgeon & M.W.Chase
Stelis rhombilabia C.Schweinf.
Stelis rhomboglossa Schltr.
Stelis rhomboidea Garay
Stelis ricaurtensis Luer & Hirtz
Stelis ricii Luer & R.Vásquez
Stelis rictoria (Rchb.f.) Pridgeon & M.W.Chase
Stelis rictus O.Duque
Stelis rimulata Luer & Hirtz
Stelis ringens Schltr.
Stelis riozunagensis Luer & Hirtz
Stelis risaraldae Luer & R.Escobar
Stelis robertoi Luer
Stelis rodrigoi (Luer) Pridgeon & M.W.Chase
Stelis rosamariae Luer & Hirtz
Stelis roseopunctata (Lindl.) R.Bernal
Stelis rostrata Luer
Stelis rostratissima (Luer & J.Portilla) Karremans
Stelis rostriformis Zambrano & Solano
Stelis rosulenta Luer & R.Vásquez
Stelis rotunda Luer & Hirtz
Stelis rubens Schltr.
Stelis rudiculifera Luer
Stelis rudolphiana Luer & Sijm
Stelis rufescens Luer
Stelis rufobrunnea (Lindl.) L.O.Williams
Stelis ruprechtiana Rchb.f.
Stelis ruris O.Duque
Stelis rutrum Luer & R.Vásquez

S

Stelis saavedrensis Luer & R.Vásquez
Stelis saccata Luer & Hirtz
Stelis sagittata Zambrano & Solano
Stelis sagittosa Luer & R.Vásquez
Stelis salazarii Solano
Stelis salomonica O.Duque
Stelis salpingantha (Luer & Hirtz) Pridgeon & M.W.Chase
Stelis saltatrix Luer & R.Vásquez
Stelis samaipatensis Luer & R.Vásquez
Stelis samson Luer & R.Escobar
Stelis sanchezii Luer & Hirtz
Stelis sanchoi Ames
Stelis sanctae-rosae Luer & Hirtz
Stelis sanguinea Garay
Stelis sanluisensis Foldats
Stelis santiagoensis Mansf.
Stelis santiagoi Luer & Hirtz
Stelis sarae Luer & Hirtz
Stelis sarcophylla Luer
Stelis satyrella Luer & Hirtz
Stelis satyrica Luer & Hirtz
Stelis saurocephala Luer & Hirtz
Stelis saurota Luer & R.Escobar
Stelis scaberula Luer & Hirtz
Stelis scabrata (Lindl.) Pridgeon & M.W.Chase
Stelis scabrida Lindl.
Stelis scalaris Luer & R.Escobar
Stelis scalena Luer & Hirtz
Stelis scandens Rolfe
Stelis scansor Rchb.f.
Stelis scaphoglossa Luer & Hirtz
Stelis scaphoides O.Duque
Stelis scariosa (Lex.) Karremans
Stelis sceptrumrubrum Luer & R.Escobar
Stelis schenckii Schltr.
Stelis schistochila Luer & Hirtz
Stelis schlechteriana Garay
Stelis schlimii (Luer) Karremans
Stelis schmidtchenii Schltr.
Stelis schnitteri Schltr.
Stelis schomburgkii Fawc. & Rendle
Stelis scitula Luer & Hirtz
Stelis sclerophylla (Lindl.) Karremans
Stelis scolnikiae (Luer & Endara) J.M.H.Shaw
Stelis scopulosa Luer & Hirtz
Stelis scutella O.Duque
Stelis scutellifera Luer & R.Escobar
Stelis secunda Luer & Dalström
Stelis secundosa Luer
Stelis segoviensis (Rchb.f.) Pridgeon & M.W.Chase
Stelis sellaformis O.Duque
Stelis semperflorens Luer
Stelis septella Luer
Stelis septicola Luer & Endara
Stelis seriata Luer & R.Vásquez
Stelis serra Lindl.
Stelis serrulifera Luer & Hirtz
Stelis sessilis Luer & Toscano
Stelis setacea Lindl.
Stelis siberica Luer & R.Vásquez
Stelis signifera Luer & R.Vásquez
Stelis sijmii Luer
Stelis silverstonei Luer
Stelis silvestris Luer & R.Escobar
Stelis simplex (Ames & C.Schweinf.) Pridgeon & M.W.Chase
Stelis simplicilabia (C.Schweinf.) Pridgeon & M.W.Chase
Stelis singularis Luer & Hirtz
Stelis siphonantha (Luer) Pridgeon & M.W.Chase
Stelis situlifera Luer & Hirtz
Stelis skutchii Ames
Stelis sobrina Luer & R.Escobar
Stelis soconuscana Solano
Stelis solomonii Luer
Stelis somnolenta Luer & Hirtz
Stelis soratana (Rchb.f.) Karremans
Stelis soricina Luer & Hirtz
Stelis sororcula Luer & Hirtz
Stelis sotoarenasii Solano
Stelis sparsiflora Luer & Hirtz
Stelis spathilabia (Schltr.) Karremans
Stelis spathosa (Luer & R.Escobar) Pridgeon & M.W.Chase
Stelis spathulata Poepp. & Endl.
Stelis spathuliformis (Luer & R.Vásquez) Karremans
Stelis speckmaieri Luer & Sijm
Stelis splendens Luer
Stelis standleyi Ames
Stelis stapedia O.Duque
Stelis steganopus Garay
Stelis steinbachii Luer
Stelis stelidiopsis (Luer) Pridgeon & M.W.Chase
Stelis stenophylla Rchb.f.
Stelis stergiosii (Carnevali & I.Ramírez) Karremans
Stelis stevensonii Luer
Stelis steyermarkii Foldats
Stelis stigmatosa Luer & R.Escobar
Stelis stipitata Luer & R.Escobar
Stelis stiriosa Luer & Dalström
Stelis stolonifera Luer & Hirtz
Stelis storkii Ames
Stelis straminea Luer & R.Escobar
Stelis strictissima Luer & Hirtz
Stelis strigosa Luer & R.Vásquez
Stelis striolata Lindl.
Stelis strobilacea Luer
Stelis subequalis Luer & R.Vásquez
Stelis subinconspicua Schltr.
Stelis sublesta Luer & R.Escobar
Stelis subtilis Luer & Dalström
Stelis succuba Luer & R.Vásquez
Stelis suinii (Luer) J.M.H.Shaw
Stelis sulcata O.Duque
Stelis sumacoensis Luer & Hirtz
Stelis superbiens Lindl.
Stelis supervivens Luer & Hirtz
Stelis surrogatilabia Luer & Hirtz
Stelis susanensis (Hoehne) Pridgeon & M.W.Chase
Stelis synsepala Cogn.

T

Stelis tachirensis Foldats
Stelis tamboensis Luer & R.Vásquez
Stelis tanythrix Luer & Hirtz
Stelis tarantula (Luer & Hirtz) Pridgeon & M.W.Chase
Stelis tarda Luer & Hirtz
Stelis taurina O.Duque
Stelis tauroculus Luer & R.Escobar
Stelis taxis (Luer) Pridgeon & M.W.Chase
Stelis teaguei Luer & Hirtz
Stelis tempestuosa Luer & Hirtz
Stelis tenebrosa (Archila, Szlach. & Chiron) Karremans
Stelis tenuicaulis Lindl.
Stelis tenuifolia Luer & Hirtz
Stelis tenuilabris Lindl.
Stelis tenuipetala Garay
Stelis tenuissima Schltr.
Stelis tepuiensis (Carnevali & I.Ramírez) Karremans
Stelis tetramera Luer
Stelis thamiostachya Luer & Endara
Stelis thecoglossa Rchb.f.
Stelis thelephora Luer, Thoerle & F.Werner
Stelis thermophila Schltr.
Stelis thoerleae Luer
Stelis thomasiae (Luer) Pridgeon & M.W.Chase
Stelis thymochila (Luer) Pridgeon & M.W.Chase
Stelis tinekae Luer & R.Vásquez
Stelis tintinnabula (Luer) Pridgeon & M.W.Chase
Stelis titanica Luer & R.Escobar
Stelis tobarii Luer & Hirtz
Stelis tolimensis Schltr.
Stelis tomcroatii Luer
Stelis tomentosa Luer & R.Vásquez
Stelis tonduziana Schltr.
Stelis torrenticola Luer & R.Vásquez
Stelis tortilis (Luer & R.Escobar) Pridgeon & M.W.Chase
Stelis tortuosa Luer & Hirtz
Stelis torulosa Luer & R.Escobar
Stelis translucens Luer & Hirtz
Stelis transversalis Ames
Stelis triangulabia Ames
Stelis triangularis Barb.Rodr.
Stelis triangulisepala C.Schweinf.
Stelis triapiculata Dod
Stelis triaristata Luer
Stelis tricardium Lindl.
Stelis trichoglottis Luer & Dodson
Stelis trichorrhachis Rchb.f.
Stelis trichostoma (Luer) Pridgeon & M.W.Chase
Stelis tricula Luer & Hirtz
Stelis tridactyloides Luer & Hirtz
Stelis tridactylon Luer
Stelis tridentata Lindl.
Stelis trifoliacea Luer & R.Escobar
Stelis trilobata O.Duque
Stelis trimera Luer
Stelis triplaris Luer & R.Escobar
Stelis triplex Luer & Hirtz
Stelis triplicata Lindl.
Stelis triseta Lindl.
Stelis tritriangulata Luer & R.Escobar
Stelis trochophora Luer & R.Escobar
Stelis tropex Luer & Endara
Stelis trulla (Rchb.f. & Warsz.) Pridgeon & M.W.Chase
Stelis trullifera Luer & R.Vásquez
Stelis trullilabia Luer & R.Escobar
Stelis truncata Lindl.
Stelis tryssa Luer & R.Escobar
Stelis tsubotae Luer & R.Escobar
Stelis tumida Luer & Hirtz
Stelis tunariensis Luer & R.Vásquez
Stelis tunguraguae (F.Lehm. & Kraenzl.) Pridgeon & M.W.Chase
Stelis tweedieana Lindl.
Stelis tyria Luer, Thoerle & F.Werner

U–V

Stelis uberis Luer & R.Escobar
Stelis umbelliformis Hespenh. & Dressler
Stelis umbonis Luer & Hirtz
Stelis umbriae Schltr.
Stelis uncifera Luer & Hirtz
Stelis uncinata Pridgeon & M.W.Chase
Stelis uncinula Luer & Hirtz
Stelis undecimi Luer & F.Werner
Stelis unduavica (Luer & R.Vásquez) Karremans
Stelis unduaviensis Luer & R.Vásquez
Stelis undulata Luer & Hirtz
Stelis uniflora Luer & Hirtz
Stelis uninervia C.Schweinf.
Stelis uribeorum Luer & R.Escobar
Stelis uvaegelata L.E.Matthews
Stelis validipes Luer & R.Escobar
Stelis valladolidensis Luer & D'Aless.
Stelis vallata Luer
Stelis valvulosa Luer & R.Escobar
Stelis vanescens Luer
Stelis vargasii (C.Schweinf.) Pridgeon & M.W.Chase
Stelis varicella Luer & R.Vásquez
Stelis variola Luer & R.Escobar
Stelis vasqueziana Karremans
Stelis vasquezii (Luer) Karremans
Stelis vegrandis (Luer & Dodson) Pridgeon & M.W.Chase
Stelis velaticaulis (Rchb.f.) Pridgeon & M.W.Chase
Stelis velatipes (Rchb.f.) Karremans
Stelis velivolva Luer & Hirtz
Stelis velutina Lindl.
Stelis venezuelensis Foldats
Stelis venosa Luer & Endara
Stelis veracrucensis Solano
Stelis veraguasensis Luer
Stelis verbiformis (Luer) Pridgeon & M.W.Chase
Stelis verecunda Schltr.
Stelis verruculosa Luer & R.Escobar
Stelis vesca Luer & Hirtz
Stelis vespertina Solano & Soto Arenas
Stelis vestita Ames
Stelis viamontis Luer & Hirtz
Stelis vicaria Luer & R.Escobar
Stelis vigax Luer & R.Escobar
Stelis vigoris Luer & R.Escobar
Stelis villifera Luer
Stelis villosa (Knowles & Westc.) Pridgeon & M.W.Chase
Stelis villosilabia Luer & Hirtz
Stelis violacea Garay
Stelis virgata (Luer) Pridgeon & M.W.Chase
Stelis virgulata Schltr.
Stelis viridibrunnea F.Lehm. & Kraenzl.
Stelis viridiflava (Karremans & Bogarín) Karremans & Bogarín
Stelis viridula Luer
Stelis vollesii Luer & Dodson
Stelis voluptuosa Luer & R.Escobar
Stelis vulcani Rchb.f.
Stelis vulpecula Luer & R.Escobar

W–Z

Stelis wagneri (Schltr.) Pridgeon & M.W.Chase
Stelis walteri Schltr.
Stelis weberbaueri Schltr.
Stelis weddelliana (Rchb.f.) Pridgeon & M.W.Chase
Stelis wendtii Solano
Stelis wercklei Schltr.
Stelis werneri Schltr.
Stelis wilhelmii Luer
Stelis williamsii Ames
Stelis xenica Luer & R.Escobar
Stelis xerophila (Schltr.) Soto Arenas
Stelis ximenae Luer & Hirtz
Stelis xiphizusa (Rchb.f. & Warsz.) Pridgeon & M.W.Chase
Stelis xystophora Luer
Stelis yanganensis Luer & Hirtz
Stelis zamorae Luer & Hirtz
Stelis zarumae Luer & Hirtz
Stelis zelenkoi Luer & Hirtz
Stelis zelleri Luer
Stelis zigzag Luer & Hirtz
Stelis zongoensis Luer & R.Vásquez
Stelis zootrophionoides Castañeda-Zárate & Ramos-Castro
Stelis zothecula Luer
Stelis zunagensis (Luer & Hirtz) Pridgeon & M.W.Chase

References

Stelis